The Renault Scénic Vision is an electric concept crossover produced by Renault. The vehicle was presented in May 2022, for an estimated release date in 2024.

History
The Scénic Vision concept was presented on 19 May 2022.

Initially black, the Scénic Vision body color turned to white on the occasion of the 2022 Paris Motor Show.

Overview

The concept car is based on Groupe Renault's CMF-EV (Common Module Family-Electric Vehicles) platform unveiled by the Renault Mégane E-Tech Electric. It has rear doors with antagonistic opening and it has no central pillar, which allows easy access to the passenger compartment, and it is designed with 70% recycled materials.

Inside, the Scénic Vision has a floor made from recycled milk bottles and pipes. The seats are made of polyester. According to Renault, all passenger contact surfaces are fully recycled. Technologically, the head restraints incorporate a system made up of microphones and loudspeakers. The cabin of the Scénic Vision has small adjustable screens offering shortcuts. This concept car also has “camera” mirrors.

The Scénic Vision has a 160 kW electric motor, which placed on the rear axle. It is powered by a 40 kWh lithium-ion battery, recharged by a 15 kW hydrogen fuel cell that acts as a range extender.

References

External links

Scénic Vision
Electric concept cars